WSCW (1410 AM) is a radio station licensed to serve South Charleston, West Virginia, United States.  The station is owned by L.M. Communications of Kentucky, LLC.

References

External links
News/Talk WSCW 1410AM/102.3 FM Online

SCW
Radio stations established in 1964
1964 establishments in West Virginia
Talk radio stations in the United States
Conservative talk radio
SCW
South Charleston, West Virginia